Charlie McNeil (11 March 1963 – 11 December 2016) was a Scottish professional footballer who played for Grangemouth International, Stirling Albion and Kilsyth Rangers, as a winger.

References

1963 births
2016 deaths
Scottish footballers
Stirling Albion F.C. players
Kilsyth Rangers F.C. players
Scottish Football League players
Association football wingers